The Silkin Test is a UK planning policy designed to control major developments which will affect areas classified as National Parks and Areas of Outstanding Natural Beauty (AONB).

The three main criteria state that -
it must be in the National interest;
there is no practicable alternative to development in a National Park;
must be built in a way that minimises detrimental effects on the environment.

The test was contained in Planning Policy Statement (PPS) 7: Sustainable Development in Rural Areas (formerly PPG7)
PPS7 has now been replaced by the National Planning Policy Framework (2012), in which paras. 115/116 set out a differently-worded test.

History
The criteria were first proposed by the then Minister of Town and Country Planning, Lewis Silkin MP in 1949.

Notable applications
South Wales Gas Pipeline (2007)

See also
Lewis Silkin, 1st Baron Silkin
Sandford approach (1976)
Waldegrave formulation (1987)

References

United Kingdom planning policy